Philipp Strauch (1852-1934) was a German medievalist. A specialist in Middle High German literature, he was awarded a habilitation by the University of Tübingen in 1878, and became professor there in 1883. In 1893 he received a call to the University of Halle-Wittenberg, where he remained until his retirement in 1921, serving as professor ordinarius and as rector of the university.

Strauch published important research on Mechthild of the Palatinate as a patron of literature, on medieval German Mysticism including Meister Eckhart, and on the literature of the Teutonic Order. He was also of great importance as an editor. His critical edition of the chronicles of Jans der Enikel was published as part of the Monumenta Germaniae Historica, and remains the standard text. He also edited Adelheid Langmann, Der Marner and others.

References

External Links
 Entry on the website of the University of Halle

1852 births
1934 deaths
Germanists
German medievalists
German literary historians
German philologists
Germanic studies scholars